Washington Township is one of eighteen townships in Buena Vista County, Iowa, USA.  As of the 2000 census, its population was 663.

Geography
According to the USGS, it contains one cemetery, Buena Vista Memorial Park.

References

External links
 US-Counties.com
 City-Data.com

Townships in Buena Vista County, Iowa
Townships in Iowa